The  is a railway line in Tokyo, Japan, operated by private railway company Keisei Electric Railway. It connects Oshiage Station in Sumida and Aoto Station in Katsushika.

The Oshiage Line passes through areas typical of Tokyo's shitamachi ("down town") working-class sections known for their distinctively earthy atmosphere.

Basic data
Gauge: 
Track: double
Block system: Automatic
ATC/ATS: C-ATS

Service patterns
The following types of service operate on the line.
 
Through service on the Keisei Narita Sky Access Line.
Through services to Toei Asakusa Line and Keikyu Line, Airport Limited Express for Haneda Airport.
 
Through services to Toei Asakusa Line and Keikyu Line, Airport Limited Express on the Asakusa Line, Limited Express (Kaitoku) on the Keikyu Line for Haneda Airport.
 
 
 
Through service on the Keisei Main Line.
 
Trans stop at all stations along the Oshiage Line.
Through services to Toei Asakusa Line and Keikyu Main Line, Limited Express (Kaitoku) for Misakiguchi.
Through services to Hokuso Line.

Stations
{| class="wikitable"
!rowspan="2"|No.
!rowspan="2"|Name
!rowspan="2"|Japanese
!colspan="2"|Distance (km)
!rowspan="2"|AccessExpress
!rowspan="2"|Ltd.Express(green)
!rowspan="2"|Ltd.Express(red)
!rowspan="2"|Comm.Express
!rowspan="2"|Rapid
!rowspan="2"|Transfers
!rowspan="2"|Location
|-
!Betweenstations
!Total
|-
| align=center colspan=12 |↑ Through-running to/from ↑

 via the  Toei Asakusa Line

 via the  Toei Asakusa Line and  Keikyū Main Line, and  via the  Keikyū Kurihama Line

Haneda Airport Terminal 1·2 and Terminal 3 via the  Toei Asakusa Line,  Keikyū Main Line and  Keikyū Airport Line

|-
|
|Oshiage
|押上
|-
|0.0
|style="background:orange; text-align:center;"|●
|style="background:green; text-align:center;"|●
|style="background:red; text-align:center;"|●
|style="background:skyblue; text-align:center;"|●
|style="background:pink; text-align:center;"|●
|style="white-space:nowrap;"|
|rowspan="3"|Sumida
|-
|
| 
|京成曳舟
|1.1
|1.1
|style="background:orange; text-align:center;"||
|style="background:green; text-align:center;"||
|style="background:red; text-align:center;"||
|style="background:skyblue; text-align:center;"||
|style="background:pink; text-align:center;"||
|
|-
|
| 
|八広
|1.3
|2.4
|style="background:orange; text-align:center;"||
|style="background:green; text-align:center;"||
|style="background:red; text-align:center;"||
|style="background:skyblue; text-align:center;"||
|style="background:pink; text-align:center;"||
|
|-
|
|
|四ツ木
|0.7
|3.1
|style="background:orange; text-align:center;"||
|style="background:green; text-align:center;"||
|style="background:red; text-align:center;"||
|style="background:skyblue; text-align:center;"||
|style="background:pink; text-align:center;"||
|
|rowspan="3"|Katsushika
|-
|
| 
|京成立石
|1.5
|4.6
|style="background:orange; text-align:center;"||
|style="background:green; text-align:center;"||
|style="background:red; text-align:center;"||
|style="background:skyblue; text-align:center;"||
|style="background:pink; text-align:center;"||
|
|-
|
| 
|青砥
|1.1
|5.7
|style="background:orange; text-align:center;"|●
|style="background:green; text-align:center;"|●
|style="background:red; text-align:center;"|●
|style="background:skyblue; text-align:center;"|●
|style="background:pink; text-align:center;"|●
| Keisei Main Line (Through Service)
|-
|align=center colspan=12|'↓ Through-running to/from ↓
 via the  Keisei Main Line

 via the  Keisei Main Line and  Narita Sky Access Line

 via the  Keisei Main Line and  Hokusō Line

 via the  Keisei Main Line,  Keisei Higashi-Narita Line, and  Shibayama Railway
|}

History
This line constituted part of the original Keisei Main Line, opened in 1914 as a dual track 1,372 mm gauge electrified line, but once the section from Ueno and Nippori to Aoto came into service in 1932, this line became a short branch and was renamed the "Oshiage Line".

The line was regauged to 1,435 mm in 1959 in preparation for the introduction of through services upon the opening of Tokyo Metropolitan Bureau of Transport (Toei) Line 1 (present Toei Asakusa Line) on 4 December 1960, when the line returned to its original role in the Keisei network, to provide trains from its main line to downtown Tokyo via the Toei line. It also provides connections at Oshiage to the Tobu Skytree Line and the Tokyo Metro Hanzōmon Line. The line is now a de facto'' main line of Keisei.

Former connecting lines
 Mukojima Station (since closed): The Keisei company was seeking a line to Tokyo, and encouraged the Ōji Electric Railway to construct a 1.4 km 1,372 mm gauge line to this station as part of a campaign for government approval for a Tokyo line, the line opening in 1928. However, once approval to build to Ueno was received, the Tokyo line proposal lapsed and the line closed in 1936. Mukojima Station closed in 1947.

References
This article incorporates material from the corresponding article in the Japanese Wikipedia.

Oshiage Line
Railway lines in Tokyo
Standard gauge railways in Japan